Jean Brooks (born Ruby Matilda Kelly; December 23, 1915November 25, 1963) was an American film actress and singer who appeared in over thirty films. Though she never achieved major stardom in Hollywood, she had several prominent roles in the early 1940s as a contract player for RKO Radio Pictures.

Born in Houston, Brooks spent her early life in Texas and Costa Rica. She began her career as a club singer and guitarist in New York City before being cast in several minor walk-on parts in films. She would later appear in supporting roles in the Universal Pictures serial productions Flash Gordon Conquers the Universe (1940) and The Green Hornet Strikes Again! (1941). In 1942, Brooks signed a contract with RKO and appeared in multiple films by the studio, including Jacques Tourneur's The Leopard Man (1943),  Mark Robson's horror noir The Seventh Victim (1943), and drama Youth Runs Wild (1944), as well as several films in the Falcon series.

Her later life and career were marred by struggles with alcoholism, and a series of drunken public appearances resulted in Brooks ending her contract with RKO. In 1948, she made her final film appearance in Women in the Night (1948) before abandoning her career as an actress and relocating to San Francisco, California. She died in 1963 of complications resulting from her alcoholism.

Early life
Brooks was born Ruby Matilda Kelly on December 23, 1915 in Houston, Texas, the fourth child of Horace and Robina Kelly. Through her mother, Brooks was of English and Canadian descent. Her two older brothers, Horace Jr. and Ernest, were both teenagers at the time she was born; a third son had died in 1912 at age seven of tetanus.

Brooks spent her early years in Texas but after her father's death during her childhood, she and her mother relocated to Costa Rica, her mother's native country. There, they lived on Brooks' grandfather's coffee plantation. As a result, Brooks was bilingual, fluent in both English and Spanish. During her teenage years, Brooks relocated with her mother to New York City, with plans to attend college.

Career

Beginnings
Brooks began her professional career as a singer at New York City's Waldorf-Astoria Hotel, where she sang and performed as a guitarist in Enric Madriguera's orchestra. She adopted the name Jeanne Kelly for her entertainment career, so as not to be confused with actress Ruby Keeler. With the help of Erich von Stroheim, whom Brooks had met while working at the Waldorf-Astoria Hotel, she began her acting career. Her first screen role was in the Arcturus Pictures release Obeah! (1935), a film about Obeah curses.

After having bit parts in Frankie and Johnnie and Tango-Bar (both 1935), she starred alongside von Stroheim in The Crime of Dr. Crespi (1935). Brooks parted ways with von Stroheim some time after Crespi. She then acted in the stage melodrama Name Your Poison, opposite Lenore Ulric, which premiered at the Sam S. Shubert Theatre in Newark, New Jersey on January 20, 1936.

In 1938, Brooks attempted to get back into film acting. After a failed screen test with 20th Century Fox, and the collapse of Major Productions (who had signed Brooks three weeks before going out of business), she signed a contract to star in Spanish-language films for Paramount Pictures. She landed two starring roles with Paramount, acting under the stage name Robina Duarte; her fluency in Spanish allowed her to effectively play the parts.

After the Paramount contract was completed, Brooks spent another year taking bit parts. In 1940, she signed a contract with Universal Studios, playing bit parts and minor roles in features (she is seen briefly in Abbott and Costello's Buck Privates) and serials (again briefly, in Flash Gordon Conquers the Universe and The Green Hornet Strikes Again). Brooks was awarded with her first leading role in a feature film, playing Laura in the adventure thriller The Devil's Pipeline in 1940. Her performance was not well received: Variety described her as "flat." Universal still saw her potential, and gave her the feminine lead in the all-star western serial Riders of Death Valley.

RKO films

In 1941, Jean met and married writer and future film director Richard Brooks. (Though this is known to have been her second marriage, there is no information on her first.) Shortly thereafter, Universal dropped Brooks' contract. She spent most of 1942 working bit parts, now performing under the name Jean Brooks. It is likely that she adopted her husband's name as a stage name because dancer Gene Kelly began acting in films in 1942.

In 1943, she signed a contract with RKO Radio Pictures. At RKO, Brooks was to achieve her greatest success, though stardom eluded her. She appeared in six of The Falcon mystery movies before being cast as the heroine Kiki Walker in the Val Lewton-produced horror film The Leopard Man (1943), directed by Jacques Tourneur. The film received a dismissive review in The New York Times from critic Bosley Crowther, who wrote: "The most horrifying thing about it is that it actually gets on a screen."

After filming The Leopard Man, Brooks appeared in a second horror film produced by Val Lewton, playing the depressed devil-worshipper Jacqueline Gibson in The Seventh Victim (1943), the role for which she is most perhaps most widely remembered today. Though the film did not fare well with audiences at the time of its release, it would go on to receive acclaim from critics in the subsequent decades. Coincidentally, while portraying the depressed Jacqueline, Brooks' own life was falling apart: During the filming of The Seventh Victim, Brooks had separated from her husband; she and Richard Brooks divorced the following year in 1944. It was also widely rumored at the time that she had begun drinking heavily. (Cecilia Maskell, the daughter of Brooks' cousin, Gloria White, later claimed that alcoholism ran in her family).

Alcoholism and retirement
After her much-publicized divorce from Richard Brooks in 1944, Jean remained in Los Angeles and attempted to resume her career. Though she continued to land prominent roles with RKO throughout 1944, most notably The Falcon and the Co-eds and Lewton's juvenile delinquency film Youth Runs Wild, her career began to unravel and she was noticeably gaining weight as a result of her heavy drinking. She arrived at the September 1945 premiere of First Yank into Tokyo intoxicated; Kurt Crivello, a film historian who was at the premiere, described her appearance: "Jean Brooks, sad to say, was smashed. She was very, very drunk; she must have been drinking all night on the train ... some of the people there were laughing at her. Anne Jeffreys and Jane Greer looked so embarrassed. It was really very sad." In other instances, Brooks would reportedly pass out in public.

By 1946, Brooks's stock at RKO had plunged to an all-time low: having played feminine leads in the Falcon pictures, she was now reduced to a bit part in The Falcon's Alibi. Her struggles with alcoholism and her disheveled public appearances resulted in friction with RKO executives, and Brooks reportedly tore up her contract before they could fire her. Film historian Doug McClelland referred to Brooks as "RKO's resident neurotic" based on her behavior while working for the studio. Her final film with RKO was the war drama The Bamboo Blonde, released in July 1946. Two years later, Brooks made her final screen appearance in the William Rowland-directed exploitation drama Women in the Night (1948).

Personal life
Brooks married screenwriter Richard Brooks in 1941; they divorced on September 13, 1944 in Los Angeles. In 1946, Brooks met newly returned Marine Corps veteran, William Douglas Lansford, and they married. The marriage lasted 10 years, most of which were spent while Lansford was back in the armed forces (Army) and they were stationed at various bases in the U.S. It was a happy time for her while she formed amateur theater groups and worked in productions along with her husband, who was a writer, at the various places they were stationed. However, Brooks's alcoholism persisted. Lansford, too, was a heavy drinker and soon it overwhelmed the marriage. They were divorced in 1956 and Lansford remarried to Ruth Ketcham of Long Island, New York.

In 1956 Brooks wed San Francisco Examiner editor Thomas H. Leddy, to whom she was married until her death. A Protestant, Brooks converted to Roman Catholicism for the marriage. The couple resided in San Francisco, where Brooks worked as a solicitor for classified ads.

Death
In November 1963, Brooks was admitted to Kaiser Richmond Field Hospital in Richmond, California, suffering from complications from Laennec's cirrhosis, which she had lived with her last  five years. On November 25, 1963, Brooks fell into a hepatic coma, and died of the condition at 6:35 p.m. She was 47 years old. Her death certificate noted that she had suffered from "nutritional inadequacy" for 15 years, probably stemming from her alcoholism.

Brooks was buried at sea the following year, on September 10, 1964. Her burial was reported in the papers in Costa Rica, though there were no obituaries, and apparently no knowledge of her death in Hollywood. Her ex-husband, Richard Brooks, died in 1992 without knowing her whereabouts or death.

On August 7, 1990, 27 years after Brooks's death, the following appeared in The Hollywood Reporter:  "Anyone know the whereabouts of Jean Brooks? Once married to director Richard Brooks, thus her name, she was aka Jeanne Kelly and under contract to both Universal and RKO in the 1940s ... Even Richard B[rooks] and several of the actress' former pals say they've lost all contact with her."

Filmography

Stage credits

Notes

References

Works cited

External links

Jean Brooks library search at WorldCat

1915 births
1963 deaths
American film actresses
American people of Canadian descent
American people of Costa Rican descent
American people of English descent
Actresses from Houston
Alcohol-related deaths in California
Burials at sea
Converts to Roman Catholicism from Protestantism
Deaths from cirrhosis
People from Harris County, Texas
RKO Pictures contract players
Singers from Texas
20th-century American actresses
20th-century American singers
Catholics from Texas
Hispanic and Latino American actresses
Hispanic and Latino American women singers